Jessica Bygate (born 10 January 1992) is a former professional basketball player from New Zealand. She has played for the Melbourne Boomers in the WNBL and now lives is New South Wales. She is now a coach and an exercise scientist.

Early life
Bygate grew up in Nelson and received her secondary education at Nelson College for Girls. After school, she attended Lincoln University for a year.

Professional career

WBC
Bygate began her career in New Zealand, playing for the Canterbury Wildcats in the WBC. She then moved to the Nelson Sparks, where she won her first WBC championship. She then spent a season for the Junior Tall Ferns, before moving to the Australian leagues.

College
Bygate began her college career in 2011 at Moberly Area Community College in Moberly, Missouri. Impressive showings earned her a transfer to Dickinson State University in Dickinson, North Dakota where she would play for the Dickinson State Blue Hawks.

Australia
After a season with the Gladstone Power in the Queensland Basketball League, Bygate was signed by WNBL side, Adelaide Lightning for the 2015–16 season. Bygate was then signed for the 2016–17 season by the Melbourne Boomers.

National team
At the 2013 FIBA Oceania Championship for Women Bygate made her international debut where she won a silver medal as part of the Tall Ferns New Zealand women's basketball team.

References

1992 births
Living people
Adelaide Lightning players
People educated at Nelson College for Girls
Forwards (basketball)
Melbourne Boomers players
New Zealand women's basketball players
Sportspeople from Nelson, New Zealand
Basketball players at the 2018 Commonwealth Games
Commonwealth Games bronze medallists for New Zealand
Commonwealth Games medallists in basketball
Medallists at the 2018 Commonwealth Games